The Hyderabad Hawks was a domestic cricket team, based in Hyderabad, Sindh, Pakistan. The team was established in 2004 and its home ground was the Niaz Stadium. for the year 2011.

See also
 Pakistan Super League

References

External links
Twenty 20 Record page for Hyderabad Hawks
Cricketarchive page for Hyderabad Hawks

Cricket clubs established in 2004
2004 establishments in Pakistan
Cricket teams in Pakistan
Hawks